The 2014 Tilia Slovenia Open was a professional tennis tournament played on hard courts. It was the second edition of the tournament which was part of the 2014 ATP Challenger Tour. It took place in Portorož, Slovenia between 7 and 14 July 2014.

Singles main-draw entrants

Seeds

 1 Rankings are as of June 24, 2014.

Other entrants
The following players received wildcards into the singles main draw:

  Aljaz Jakob Kaplja
  Aljaž Radinski
  Tomislav Ternar
  Mike Urbanija

The following players received entry from the qualifying draw:
  Tom Kočevar-Dešman
  Erik Crepaldi
  Evgeny Karlovskiy
  Filip Veger

Doubles main-draw entrants

Seeds

1 Rankings as of June 24, 2014.

Other entrants
The following pairs received wildcards into the doubles main draw:
  Tom Kočevar-Dešman /  Mike Urbanija
  Matjaz Jurman /  Gregor Repina
  Rok Jarc /  Aljaz Jakob Kaplja

Champions

Singles

 Blaž Kavčič def.  Gilles Müller 7–5, 6–7(4–7), 6–1

Doubles

 Sergey Betov /  Aliaksandr Bury def.  Ilija Bozoljac /  Flavio Cipolla 6–0, 6–3

External links
Official Website

Tilia Slovenia Open
Tilia Slovenia Open
2014 in Slovenian tennis